is a mountain on the border between Dazaifu and Chikushino in Fukuoka Prefecture, Japan. It has an elevation of 829,6 metres

It is an important site for Shugendo, and a famous place for rock climbing.

See also
Kamado-jinja
 Dazaifu Prefectural Natural Park
 List of Historic Sites of Japan (Fukuoka)

External links

Homan
Dazaifu, Fukuoka